Calcium propanoate or calcium propionate has the formula Ca(C2H5COO)2. It is the calcium salt of propanoic acid.

Uses
As a food additive, it is listed as E number 282 in the Codex Alimentarius. Calcium propionate is used as a preservative in a wide variety of products, including: bread, other baked goods, processed meat, whey, and other dairy products. In agriculture, it is used, amongst other things, to prevent milk fever in cows and as a feed supplement. Propionates prevent microbes from producing the energy they need, like benzoates do. However, unlike benzoates, propionates do not require an acidic environment.

Calcium propionate is used in bakery products as a mold inhibitor, typically at 0.1-0.4%  (though animal feed may contain up to 1%). Mold contamination is considered a serious problem amongst bakers, and conditions commonly found in baking present near-optimal conditions for mold growth.

A few decades ago, Bacillus mesentericus (rope), was a serious problem, but today's improved sanitary practices in the bakery, combined with rapid turnover of the finished product, have virtually eliminated this form of spoilage. Calcium propionate and sodium propionate are effective against both B. mesentericus rope and mold.

Metabolism of propionate begins with its conversion to propionyl coenzyme A (propionyl-CoA), the usual first step in the metabolism of carboxylic acids. Since propanoic acid has three carbons, propionyl-CoA cannot directly enter the beta oxidation or the citric acid cycles. In most vertebrates, propionyl-CoA is carboxylated to D-methylmalonyl-CoA, which is isomerised  to L-methylmalonyl-CoA. A vitamin B12-dependent enzyme catalyzes rearrangement of L-methylmalonyl-CoA to succinyl-CoA, which is an intermediate of the citric acid cycle and can be readily incorporated there.

Children were challenged with calcium propionate or placebo through daily bread in a double‐blind placebo‐controlled crossover trial. Although there was no significant difference by two measures, a statistically significant difference was found in the proportion of children whose behaviours "worsened" with challenge (52%), compared to the proportion whose behaviour "improved" with challenge (19%). When propanoic acid was infused directly into rodents' brains, it produced reversible behavior changes (e.g. hyperactivity, dystonia, social impairment, perseveration) and brain changes (e.g. innate neuroinflammation, glutathione depletion) partially mimicking human autism.

Calcium propionate can be used as a fungicide on fruit.

In a 1973 study reported by the EPA, the waterborne administration of 180 ppm of calcium propionate was found to be slightly toxic to bluegill sunfish.

In a recent well-designed translational study, human subjects fed 500 mg of calcium propionate twice daily demonstrated a modest decrease in LDL and total cholesterol, without a change in HDL.  The study, only eight weeks in length, requires additional studies of both verification and longer duration to demonstrate the clinical value of this chemical.  The study identified a novel regulatory circuit that links the gut microbiota metabolite propionic acid (PA), a short-chain fatty acid, with the gut immune system to control intestinal cholesterol homeostasis (13).

Banning 
Calcium propanoate has been banned in certain countries such as Russia due to certain allergies and bloating.

References

External links
Center for Science in the Public Interest list of food additives

Propionates
Calcium compounds
Food preservatives
E-number additives